Skyrock may refer to:

Skyrock (social network site), a French social network site
Skyrock (radio), a French radio station